This is a list of women writers who were born in Algeria or whose writings are closely associated with that country.

A
Nora Aceval (born 1953), folk story writer
Fadhma Aït Mansour (c.1882–1967), autobiographer
Taos Amrouche (1913–1976), novelist, singer, first Algerian woman to publish a novel
Leïla Aouchal (1936–2013), French-born Algerian writer, autobiographer

B
Yamina Bachir (1954–2022), screenwriter, film director
Samira Bellil (1972–2004), Algerian-born French feminist, author of the autobiographical ''[[Dans l'enfer des tournantes
Nassira Belloula (born 1961), feminist journalist, novelist, poet, writing in French
Myriam Ben (1928–2001), activist, novelist, poet, and painter.
Latifa Ben Mansour (born 1950), novelist, playwright, short story writer, linguist
Nouria Benghabrit-Remaoun (born 1952), sociologist, politician, non-fiction writer
Khadija Benguenna (born 1965), journalist, Al Jazeera television presenter
Berthe Bénichou-Aboulker (1888–1942), first Jewish woman to be published in Algeria
Maïssa Bey (born 1950), educator, short story writer, novelist

C
Marie Cardinal (1929–2001), best selling novelist, film actress
Corinne Chevallier (born 1935), historian, novelist
Lynda Chouiten (fl. from 2012), French-language writer, educator
Hélène Cixous (born 1937), educator, novelist, poet, playwright, philosopher, critic, feminist writer

D
Djamila Debèche (1926–2010), novelist and journalist
Assia Djebar, pen name of Fatima-Zohra Imalayen (1936–2015), novelist, translator, filmmaker
Rabia Djelti (born 1954), poet, novelist, writing in Arabic

F
Fadhila El Farouk (born 1967), journalist, novelist

G
Fatima Gallaire (1944–2020), Franco-Algerian playwright, short story writer
Salima Ghezali (born 1958), acclaimed journalist, women's rights activist
Anna Gréki (1931–1966), poet

H
Mimi Hafida (born 1965), poet, journalist, visual artist

L
Djanet Lachmet (born 1948), novelist and actress
Aïcha Lemsine (born 1942), French-language writer and women's rights activist

M
Leïla Marouane (born 1960), journalist, creative writer
Malika Mokeddem (born 1949), acclaimed novelist
Ahlam Mosteghanemi (born 1953), poet, novelist, most widely read female Arabic-language writer

N
Samira Negrouche (born 1980), medical doctor, poet

S
Leïla Sebbar (born 1941), novelist, essayist, travel writer, critic, short story writer, educator

T
Wassyla Tamzali (born 1941), lawyer, non-fiction feminist writer

W
Zuhur Wanasi (born 1936), Arabic-language short story writer, journal editor, politician
Maryse Wolinski (1943–2021), Algerian-born French journalist, novelist

Z
Fatma Zohra Zamoum (born 1967), writer, filmmaker, educator

See also
List of women writers
List of Algerian writers

References

 
Algerian women writers, List of
Writers
Women writers, List of Algerian
Women writers, List of Algerian